Ortrie D. Smith (born 1946) is a senior United States district judge of the United States District Court for the Western District of Missouri.

Education and career

Born in Jonesboro, Arkansas, Smith received a Bachelor of Arts degree from the University of Missouri-Columbia in 1968 and a Juris Doctor from the University of Missouri-Kansas City School of Law in 1971. He was in private practice in Nevada, Missouri from 1971 to 1995.

Federal judicial service

On June 30, 1995, Smith was nominated by President Bill Clinton to a seat on the United States District Court for the Western District of Missouri vacated by Howard F. Sachs. Smith was confirmed by the United States Senate on August 11, 1995, and received his commission on August 14, 1995. He took senior status on April 30, 2011.

References

External links 

1946 births
Living people
Judges of the United States District Court for the Western District of Missouri
United States district court judges appointed by Bill Clinton
University of Missouri alumni
University of Missouri–Kansas City alumni
People from Jonesboro, Arkansas
20th-century American judges
21st-century American judges